Kevin Fitzpatrick (born 1942) is an Irish former footballer.

A goalkeeper, he made his one and only appearance for the Republic of Ireland national football team on 7 October 1969 in a 3–0 defeat to Czechoslovakia in Prague in a World Cup qualifying game.

He played 22 seasons with Limerick F.C., starting in 1959. He played his 675th game for Limerick in a clash with Shamrock Rovers in January 1978.

In his final game, Brendan Storan's goal defeated Bohemians in the 1982 FAI Cup final at Dalymount Park.

Honours
Limerick
League of Ireland (1): 1979-80
FAI Cup (2):  1971, 1982
League of Ireland Cup (1): 1976-77
Munster Senior Cup (2): 1963, 1977

References

The Complete Who's Who of Irish International Football, 1945-96 (1996):Stephen McGarrigle

External links
Kevin Fitzpatrick in 'Soccer Players' file at Limerick City Library, Ireland

League of Ireland players
Limerick F.C. players
League of Ireland managers
Republic of Ireland association footballers
Republic of Ireland international footballers
Association football goalkeepers
1943 births
Living people
League of Ireland XI players
Republic of Ireland football managers